Rona Mackay is a Scottish National Party (SNP) politician who has been the Member of the Scottish Parliament (MSP) for Strathkelvin and Bearsden since the Scottish Parliamentary elections in May 2016.

Background

Prior to being elected, she worked as a journalist in national newspapers for more than 20 years.

From 2010 to 2016 she sat on the Children's Panel for the East End of Glasgow.

In 2001 she was a co-ordinator of Chernobyl Children's Lifeline, a charity which brought children from Belarus who were affected by the nuclear disaster to Scotland to improve their health.

Political career
Mackay worked as a Parliamentary Assistant to Gil Paterson, the former SNP MSP for Milngavie and Clydebank, before being elected in May 2016. She was elected with a majority of 8,100 votes. She was Deputy Convenor of the Justice Committee in Session 5, was on the Education Committee and convened a number of Cross Party Groups..

At the Scottish Parliamentary election in May 2021, Mackay was re-elected with a majority of 11,484 (3,384 increase from 2016). In Session 6, she is a member of the Scottish Parliament's Criminal Justice Committee, a member of the Animal Welfare, Chronic Pain (Co-Convenor), Women’s Justice (Convenor), Fair Trade, Men's Violence Against Women and Children, Prevention and Healing of Adverse Childhood Experiences and is a Senior Party Whip.

References

External links
 
 profile on SNP website
Rona Mackay's website

Year of birth missing (living people)
Living people
Place of birth missing (living people)
Scottish journalists
Scottish women journalists
Scottish National Party MSPs
Members of the Scottish Parliament 2016–2021
Members of the Scottish Parliament 2021–2026
Female members of the Scottish Parliament